Strike Fighter Squadron 132 (VFA-132), also known as the "Privateers", was an aviation unit of the United States Navy that was based at Naval Air Station Cecil Field, Florida (USA), in service from 1984 to 1992. Their radio callsign was "Pirate."

History

VFA-132 was established on 3 January 1984 as the first squadron to be assigned the VFA designation. operating the F/A-18A Hornet from NAS Lemoore, California, and moved to NAS Cecil Field in February 1985.

In March 1986, during Freedom of Navigation exercises in the Gulf of Sidra, the squadron’s aircraft flew combat air patrols in support of the exercise, including the period of 24 and 25 March following a 24 March Libyan firing of an SA-5 missile against a U.S. aircraft operating in international waters. On 14–15 April 1986 VFA-132 aircraft, along with other units of Carrier Air Wing Thirteen (CVW-13) and A-7E Corsairs from CVW-1, provided air-to-surface AGM-45 Shrike and AGM-88 HARM missile strikes against Libyan surface-to-air missile sites at Benghazi. This was the first use of the F/A-18 in combat.

From October 1987 through April 1988 the squadron deployed to MCAS Iwakuni, Japan, and was assigned to Marine Air Group 15. While deployed to Japan, the squadron operated detachments at NAS Cubi Point, Tsuiki AB, Clark AB, Yechon AB, Misawa AB and Kadena AB.

During August–September 1989, Coral Sea, with VFA-132 embarked, operated off the coast of Lebanon following the Israeli capture of Sheik Obeid and the reported killing of Lieutenant Colonel William R. Higgins, USMC. In early September the squadron provided air cover for the CH-53 Sea Stallion helicopters used to evacuate personnel from the U.S. embassy in Beirut. After Coral Sea and CVW-13 were decommissioned, VFA-132 was reassigned to CVW-6 aboard .

During June–September 1991, CVW-6 squadrons participated in Operation Provide Comfort, flying missions over northern Iraq in support of the Kurdish relief effort.

The squadron was decommissioned on 1 June 1992.

References

See also
History of the United States Navy
List of inactive United States Navy aircraft squadrons
List of United States Navy aircraft squadrons

Strike fighter squadrons of the United States Navy
Military units and formations in Florida